The Mission of Saint Sergius or Guest House of Saint Sergius is a building built in Jerusalem in 1890 by the Imperial Orthodox Palestine Society, thanks to the grants of Grand Duke Sergei Alexandrovich. It is under the jurisdiction of the Russian Orthodox Ecclesiastical Mission in Jerusalem.

Sources
Conservons la Russie en Terre Sainte Сохраним Россию в Святой Земле! Летопись Императорского Православного Палестинского Общества 2007—2012 гг. К 130-летию ИППО Pour les 130 ans de la Société impériale orthodoxe de Palestine, éd. de la Société impériale orthodoxe de Palestine Издание ИППО // L. N. Blinova, Youri Gratchov, Oleg Ozerov, Pavel Platonov, Moscou, Jérusalem, 2012. 
Le Messager de Jérusalem, Société impériale orthodoxe de Palestine ИППО, Вып. 1. 2012. Numéro pour les 130 ans de la Société impériale orthodoxe de Palestine. 158 pages.

External links
Article of Grand Québec about the Mission of Saint Sergius of Jerusalem

Christianity in the State of Palestine
Buildings and structures in Jerusalem
19th century in Jerusalem
Russian Orthodox Ecclesiastical Mission in Jerusalem
1890 establishments in the Ottoman Empire
Buildings and structures completed in 1890